is a Japanese former swimmer. She competed in the women's 400 metre freestyle at the 1964 Summer Olympics.

References

External links
 

1947 births
Living people
Japanese female freestyle swimmers
Olympic swimmers of Japan
Swimmers at the 1964 Summer Olympics
Place of birth missing (living people)